3688 (literally "Dreaming of Fei Fei"), is a 2015 Singaporean musical/comedy film directed by Royston Tan and starring Joi Chua, Michael Tan, Rahimah Rahim, Liu Lingling and Shigga Shay. It is Tan's first feature film after an absence of 7 years.

Plot
Xia Fei Fei is a 38-year-old parking attendant, locally known as "summon auntie", or "Feng Fei Fei", who has often dreamed of becoming a singer like her idol, Feng Fei-fei since during her school days, and had won many contests singing Feng’s songs during her school days. She is good-natured, and would often give each driver a chance before issuing a ticket. She is well-loved by the drivers, but detested by her colleagues, especially the veteran Jenny and her group of minions who often scheme and plot against her. With her mother long gone, Fei Fei and her father, a retired Rediffusion sales representative, nicknamed "Uncle Radio", live a codependent life together.

At the same time, she has to deal with several other concerns, including supporting her dementia-stricken father-salesman. Fei Fei is aided by kopitiam drink-stall owner Ah Luan, who has an alter-ego, Lady Kaka (a reference to Lady Gaga), and childhood friend and taxi driver Mao Shan. When news of Feng Fei Fei’s passing broke, Fei Fei also finds something amiss with her father when he became visibly frustrated over the Rediffusion set’s malfunction. It is common knowledge that Rediffusion had been long gone. Fei Fei's worries are further worsened when she and her colleagues are retrenched with electronic parking systems replacing their roles.

In order to take care of her father and cover his rising medical expenses, Fei Fei decides to join the National Singing Competition while coming across an audition. Fei Fei eventually makes it to the finals after capturing the nation's heart with her voice and sincerity, but unintentionally offends a fellow contestant, Anita, when she was tricked into saying she was transgender. On the day leading to the finals, Fei Fei had to miss the rehearsals when she learns her father had suddenly disappeared. Despite fruitless searches around the island, she eventually shows up on the day of the finals, hoping she could find her father. She sings her performance piece, to thunderous applause.

In a post-credits scene, Fei Fei has finally found her father while he was wandering in an electronics store; as they eat breakfast together, the Rediffusion set begins to play.

Cast
Joi Chua as Xia Fei Fei
Lee Pei Fen as teenage Xia Fei Fei
Michael Tan as "Uncle Radio"
Rahimah Rahim as Jenny Rahimah
Liu Lingling as Ah Luan "Auntie Hai Xian"/Lady Kaka
Shigga Shay as Yoyo "Hai Er", Ah Luan's son
Brandon Wong as Maoshan
Jerry Huang as Fei Xiang, Fei Fei's ex-lover
Pamelyn Chee as Teresa, one of The Four Beauties / J4 (Jenny's 4)
Tracy & Teresa from Babes as Ya Ping and Shu Rong, two of The Four Beauties / J4 (Jenny's 4)
Tay Sia Yeun as Piao Piao, one of The Four Beauties / J4 (Jenny's 4)
Tan Bee Keow as Anita, a contestant in the singing competition

Lin Meijiao stars as the late mother of Fei Fei. Jim Lim, Patricia Mok and Don Richmond appear as the judges in the televised finals of the National Singing Competition. Xie Jiafa also appears as the host of that competition.

Production
Most of the filming was done at Dakota Crescent, a residential area that was built in the 1950s with first-generation HDB flats. In an interview with Royston Tan by The Straits Times, he said that the act of filming a place can help to preserve it, at least in people's memories and so "disappearing fragments of society will not be forgotten", and wanted to shoot there "as this estate would be gone by next year". Another carpark at Queen Street was used for some of the filming. Filming started in November 2014, and lasted for three weeks.

Soundtrack

The soundtrack for 3688 was released on all platforms on 15 September 2015, two days before the release of the film.

The theme song of the film is 《念》, sung by Joi Chua. Within a few weeks, it has made its way to one of the top 10 songs on YES 933's weekly charts.

Another song, "Tapau", features Shigga Shay rapping out a list of drinks ordered at coffee-shops. The music video was uploaded on YouTube on 9 August 2015. Shigga also recorded a one-minute rap on the life and career of Feng Fei-fei. The film marks the first time Shigga raps in Mandarin.

Some of the songs in the film are remakes of popular songs from the 1970s and 1980s, especially those originally sung by Feng Fei-fei.

Reception
John Lui of The Straits Times gave 3688 3.5/5 stars, stating that although "Tan's forte is detail and mood" and that there is "sparkle and heart", he needs "fresher ways to express his vision". Furthermore, there is a "lack of narrative discipline", and "motifs are repeated ad nauseam, skits are inserted willy-nilly and music sequences serve neither character or story".

Box office
3688 collected S$191,000 between 17 and 20 September, topping the opening weekend box office chart for a Singaporean film released outside Chinese New Year, however it was surpassed by Mr. Unbelievable in December 2015.

References

External links
 

2015 films
2010s Mandarin-language films
Hokkien-language films
Malay-language films
2010s English-language films
Films directed by Royston Tan
Films shot in Singapore
Films set in Singapore
2015 multilingual films
Singaporean multilingual films
English-language Singaporean films